Mikhail Khmelnitskiy (born 24 July 1969) is a male race walker who represented the USSR and later Belarus.

Achievements

External links

1969 births
Living people
Belarusian male racewalkers
Athletes (track and field) at the 1996 Summer Olympics
Athletes (track and field) at the 2000 Summer Olympics
Olympic athletes of Belarus
World Athletics Championships medalists